Kaechon Airport(개천비행장) is an airport near Kaechon, Pyongannam-do, North Korea.

Facilities 
The airfield has a single concrete runway 05/23 measuring 8180 x 190 feet (2493 x 58 m).  It has a parallel taxiway with earth aircraft revetments, and other taxiways leading southwest to tunnels in a nearby hill.

References 

Airports in North Korea
South Pyongan